Houston, We've Got a Problem is a 1974 American made-for-television drama film about the Apollo 13 spaceflight, directed by Lawrence Doheny and starring Ed Nelson in the role of NASA Flight Director Gene Kranz.

Technical and historical accuracy

The title of the film is a misquotation of the ominous announcement made by Commander Jim Lovell following the explosion of an oxygen tank which tore off the side of the spacecraft's service module. Lovell actually said, "Houston, we've had a problem".

The film does not focus on the spaceflight itself, but rather on the crises in Mission Control. Jim Lovell wrote a letter to TV Guide about the film, saying that the crises in Mission Control were dramatized. Lovell called the film "fictitious and in poor taste."

Executive producer Herman Saunders said he could have never sold the television station on a documentary and that warnings were added to the film to indicate it was fictitious.

References

External links

1974 films
1974 television films
Films about the Apollo program
American television films
American films based on actual events
Films produced by Harve Bennett
Films set in 1970
Films set in Houston
Films shot in Houston
Apollo 13